The 2000–01 Russian Superleague season was the fifth season of the Russian Superleague, the top level of ice hockey in Russia. 18 teams participated in the league, and Metallurg Magnitogorsk won the championship.

First round

Second round

Group A

Group B

Group C

Playoffs

3rd place: Severstal Cherepovets – Lokomotiv Yaroslavl 1:0, 2:2

External links
Season on hockeyarchives.ru

Russian Superleague seasons
1